Aaroe, Aaröe, Aarøe is a surname. Notable people with the surname include: 

Alden Aaroe (1918–1993), American broadcast journalist
Ami Aaröe (born 1925), Swedish actress
Peder A. Aarøe (1868–1927), Norwegian trade unionist